Vitaly Ivanovich Sorokin (8 December 1935 – 1995) was a Russian swimmer, who competed at the 1956 and 1960 Summer Olympics. He won a bronze medal in 1956 and finished eighth in 1960 in the  freestyle relay. In 1956 he set a world record in the  freestyle relay. Between 1956 and 1959 he also set 6 European and 18 national records in freestyle relay events.

After retiring from competitions he worked as a swimming coach. Galina Prozumenshchikova was among his students.

References

1935 births
1995 deaths
Russian male freestyle swimmers
Olympic swimmers of the Soviet Union
Swimmers at the 1956 Summer Olympics
Swimmers at the 1960 Summer Olympics
Olympic bronze medalists for the Soviet Union
Olympic bronze medalists in swimming
World record setters in swimming
Soviet male freestyle swimmers
Medalists at the 1956 Summer Olympics